Santalum yasi is a species of flowering plant  in the mistletoe family, Santalaceae, that is native to Fiji, Tonga and Niue. It is known as yasi or yasi dina in the Fijian language.

References

 
yasi

Trees of Fiji
Plants described in 1861